Stringsongs is a composition for string quartet by the American composer Meredith Monk.  The work was commissioned by the Kronos Quartet who premiered the piece on January 22, 2005 in the Barbican Centre, London.

Composition
Stringsongs was Monk's first composition for string quartet.  She described her inspiration and the composition process in the score program notes, writing:

Structure
The work has a duration of roughly 18 minutes and is composed in four movements:
Cliff Light
Tendrils
Obsidian Chorale
Phantom Strings

Reception
Reviewing the world premiere, Tom Service of The Guardian praised Stringsongs, writing, "[Monk's] music sidesteps traditional string quartet forms to create a work of mysterious, mythic power."  Nadia Sirota of WQXR-FM similarly lauded, "Her first string quartet, the piece explores texture and raw emotion that achieves maximum impact with minimum components."

The music critic George Hall was more critical of the music, however, calling the work "a more discursive four-movement piece that felt unwieldy."

References

Compositions by Meredith Monk
2005 compositions
Compositions for string quartet
Music commissioned by the Kronos Quartet